Hypsopygia alluaudalis is a species of snout moth in the genus Hypsopygia. It was described by Patrice J.A. Leraut in 2006 and is known from Kenya.

References

Moths described in 2006
Endemic moths of Kenya
Pyralini
Moths of Africa